A pizzo – also known as an pilo, oil burner, bubble, tweak pipe, meth pipe, gack pipe, crank pipe, chicken bone, or ice pipe – is a glass pipe which consists of a tube connected to a spherical bulb with a small opening on top designed for freebasing methamphetamine or crack cocaine as well as other drugs. There are some legitimate uses for these pipes including applying the hole "on the top of an eucalyptus bottle" for inhaling aromas or moisture.

These pipes are often sold at head shops and convenience stores, though local and national restrictions often apply and sellers may be subject to fines and/or jail time. In Modesto, California, local investigators seized thousands of oil burners from head shops. Eight people were subjected to citations which could bring up to $1,000 in fines and possibly six months of jail time.

Pizzos are often advertised as "oil burners" or "mystic vases" designed for burning incense oils. Wish.com has listed the glass item as a "Colored Glass Oil Burner Pipe" and received criticism from the Queensland government as the region struggled to battle the rising use of methamphetamine.

See also
Drug paraphernalia
Love rose

References

Drug paraphernalia
Methamphetamine
Cocaine